The Louis Braille Bicentennial silver dollar is a commemorative coin issued by the United States Mint in 2009.

Legislation
The Louis Braille Bicentennial-Braille Literacy Commemorative Coin Act authorized the production of a commemorative silver dollar to commemorate the bicentennial of the birth of Louis Braille. The act allowed the coins to be struck in both proof and uncirculated finishes. The coin was first released on March 26, 2009.

Design
The obverse of the Louis Braille Bicentennial-Braille Literacy commemorative dollar, designed by Joel Iskowitz and sculpted by Phebe Hemphill, features a portrait of Louis Braille.  The reverse, designed by Susan Gamble and sculpted by Joseph Menna, shows a child reading a book in Braille below the letters ⠃⠗⠇(BRL, the abbreviation for Braille) in Braille code.

Specifications
 Display Box Color: Dark Blue
 Edge: Reeded
 Weight: 26.730 grams; 0.8594 troy ounce
 Diameter: 38.10 millimeters; 1.500 inches
 Composition: 90% Silver, 10% Copper

See also

 List of United States commemorative coins and medals (2000s)
 United States commemorative coins

References

Modern United States commemorative coins
United States silver coins
United States dollar coins
2009 establishments in the United States